The Miss Universe Zambia is a Beauty pageant to select Zambian women to compete in the Miss Universe pageant. Alice Rowland’s Musukwa is the national director for Miss Universe Zambia

History

1995–1999
The Miss Universe Zambia headquartered in Lusaka and created first winning pageant, Luo Punobantu of Lusaka to Miss Universe 1995 in Windhoek, Namibia. This period the Miss Zambia organizer had only contributed in 1995 and 1999 editions of Miss Universe. Between in 1996 and 1998 due to uncertain franchise holder and lack financial to send a delegate to Miss Universe, former organizer did not participate in Miss Universe.

2005–2010
The Miss Universe Zambia took over by Mrs. Wendy Chandra-Fornari in Lusaka. The Miss Universe Zambia winners mostly achieved high placement in another beauty competitions such as Miss Tourism Queen International and Miss Africa International. On May 28th, 2010 the last Miss Universe Zambia under Mrs. Wendy was Alice Rowlands Musukwa of Chipata. She represented Zambia in Miss Universe 2010 edition in Las Vegas, USA.

2017–present
In 2017, former Miss Universe Zambia 2010 Alice Rowlands took over The Miss Universe Zambia franchise.

Titleholders

The winner of Miss Universe Zambia represents the country at the Miss Universe pageant. On occasion, when the winner does not qualify (due to age) a runner-up is sent.

Notable winner notes

References

External links

Miss Universe by country
Beauty pageants in Zambia
Recurring events established in 1995
Zambian awards